Totò Tarzan is a 1950 Italian comedy film directed by Mario Mattoli and starring Totò, Marilyn Buferd and Alba Arnova. It is a parody of Edgar Rice Burroughs's novel Tarzan of the Apes. It was shot at the Farnesina Studios in Rome. The film's sets were designed by the art director Piero Filippone. As with Totò's other films of the era it was a commercial success, taking around 385 million lira at the box office.

Plot
Antonio is a foundling who has lived for years in the jungle along with the monkey Bongo. But one day a troop of scouts passed into the forests of the Congo and finds him out. Antonio is well reported in civil society, where he learned, not without many difficulties and funny situations, the usages of  men. In addition egl falls also Iva, only girl to truly understand his suffering due to separation from its environment. In fact, Antonio discovers that he also came from a noble family and had inherited a substantial sum of money. This opportunity will be exploited by cruel colleagues of Iva to seize all the money taking advantage of the inability Antonio, but Iva protects him and soon the two find themselves in trouble. The project of the monkey Bongo will help Antonio and Iva against the wicked.

Cast
 Totò as Antonio Della Buffas
 Marilyn Buferd as Iva
 Bianca Maria Fusari as La maestra
 Alba Arnova as Sonia
 Adriana Serra as Marta
 Luisa Poselli as Giacoma, la moglie dei procuratore generale
 Galeazzo Benti as L'esercitatore dei superparacadutisti
 Vira Silenti as Dora
 Tino Buazzelli as Spartaco
 Mario Castellani as Stanis
 Enrico Luzi as  Lawyer Finotti
 Vinicio Sofia as Baron Rosen
 Luigi Pavese as Roy 
 Guglielmo Barnabò as Colonel 
 Nico Pepe as Lawyer Micozzi 
 Carlo Croccolo as Lo sposino
 Alberto Sorrentino as Anselmo
 Giacomo Furia as Chef
 Aldo Giuffrè as Paratrooper
 Riccardo Billi as Il capostazione siciliano
 Nino Vingelli as Il capostazione napoletano
 Guglielmo Inglese as Il capostazione pugliese
 Ughetto Bertucci as Il capostazione romano  
 Mario Siletti as Butler 
 Sophia Loren as Tarzanide

References

Bibliography
 Chiti, Roberto & Poppi, Roberto. Dizionario del cinema italiano: Dal 1945 al 1959. Gremese Editore, 1991.

External links

1950 films
1950 comedy films
1950s Italian-language films
Italian black-and-white films
Italian comedy films
Films directed by Mario Mattoli
Tarzan parodies
1950s Italian films